The Everglades Forever Act is a Florida law passed in 1994 designed to restore the Everglades.  The law recognized, the “Everglades ecological system is endangered as a result of adverse changes in water quality, and in the quantity, distribution and timing of flows, and, therefore, must be restored and protected.”   The law was codified in § 373.4592, Florida Statutes.  The law was amended twice in 2003.

History
The Act was approved by Governor Lawton Chiles on May 3, 1994, and is filed as Chapter 94-115 of the General Acts, Resolutions, of the Florida Legislature published in 1994.

Phosphorus Reduction
The Act directed the State of Florida to develop a phosphorus criterion standard for the Everglades Protection Area.

Everglades Construction Project (1997)
Using data collected from the Everglades Nutrient Removal Project, which acted as a small scale model offering insight into the best implementation of both design and management, the Everglades Construction Project began in the spring of 1997 and was part of an $825 million water quality restoration project included in the Everglades Forever Act. In an effort to help restore the Everglades ecosystem, the project proposed the construction of 6 flow-through treatment marshes, called Stormwater treatment areas, to help reduce phosphorus levels in water that was bound for Everglades National Park. 

Meant to augment the natural filtration abilities of marshes, the plan called for STA construction on more than 40,000 acres of land. Each of the STA locations are positioned downstream of major agricultural discharge canals therefore ensuring that all water flowing to the Everglades would first have to pass through for treatment.

Agriculture Privilege Tax
The Act created a tax on farmers in the Everglades Agricultural Area, which would be reduced if farmers in the EAA complied with Best Management Practices.

References

1994 in Florida
Everglades
Florida statutes